Troutdale may refer to:

 Troutdale, Michigan
 Troutdale, Oregon
 Portland–Troutdale Airport
 Troutdale, Virginia